Andre's Mother is a 1990 American made-for-television drama film written by Terrence McNally, adapted from his 1988 stage play, directed by Deborah Reinisch and starring Richard Thomas, Sada Thompson, and Sylvia Sidney. It was broadcast on the PBS television program American Playhouse on March 7, 1990.

Plot
The play is set at the Manhattan memorial service for Andre Gerard, who died of AIDS and was buried in Dallas several weeks earlier.  Andre's mother Katharine cannot come to terms with his death or share her grief with Cal, Andre's lover. Her rage is directed not only at Cal and her own mother, who was less judgmental of her grandson's life, but at Andre himself as well.

Cast

Sada Thompson as Katharine Gerard, Andre's mother 
Richard Thomas as Cal Porter, Andre's surviving lover
Sylvia Sidney as Mrs. Downs, Katharine's mother

Production
The screenplay by Terrence McNally is an expansion of his eight-minute play written for an anthology titled Urban Blight that was produced by the Manhattan Theater Club in 1988.

The film was produced by WGBH Boston and was broadcast on March 14, 1990, by PBS stations nationwide as part of the American Playhouse series. It was released on Region 1 DVD on April 25, 2006.

Critical reception
John O'Connor of The New York Times called it one of those

Awards
McNally won the Emmy Award for Outstanding Writing for a Miniseries, Movie or a Dramatic Special, and the National Board of Review named it Outstanding Television Movie of the Year.

References

External links
 

1990 drama films
1990 television films
American LGBT-related television films
American films based on plays
Films with screenplays by Terrence McNally
Films set in New York City
Gay-related films
HIV/AIDS in American films
HIV/AIDS in television
American Playhouse
American drama television films